Escape from Pain is an EP by the thrash metal band Intruder. It was originally released on Metal Blade and Caroline in 1990 re issued in December, 2006 by Lost and Found Records limited to 500 copies.

Escape from Pain was admittedly released as an excuse to tour. It features three re-recorded songs from previous albums, a cover of "25 or 6 to 4" by Chicago, and just one new song (the title track). It is also the only one of their Metal Blade releases not to be issued on all three formats of CD, cassette and vinyl.

Track listing

Personnel
 Jimmy Hamilton - vocals
 Arthur Vinett - guitar
 Greg Messick - guitar
 Todd Nelson - bass
 John Pieroni - drums
Production
 Tom Harding - recording and mixing
 Rich Larson, Steve Fastner - cover art

References

1990 EPs
Metal Blade Records EPs
Caroline Records EPs
Intruder (American band) albums